Situla is the Latin for bucket or pail, and is used in archaeology and art history for a variety of historic objects with this shape.

Situla can also mean:

Situla culture or "situla art", a phase of the European Iron Age in north Italy, Slovenia etc., when decorated bronze situlas were prominent  
Situla of the Pania, Etruscan, ivory
Situla Benvenuti, north Italy
Vače Situla Slovenia
 Kappa Aquarii, a star in the constellation Aquarius
 Nassa situla, a sea snail of family Nassariidae
 USS Situla (AK-140), a US Navy cargo ship, in service 1943–1946